Rubin Jackson is an American former basketball player, best known for his college career at Oklahoma City University, where in the 1980–81 NCAA Division I men's basketball season he was named the Midwestern City Conference (now the Horizon League) Co-Player of the Year.

Jackson, a 6'4" shooting guard from Melrose High School in Memphis, Tennessee, played collegiately at Claremore Junior College (now Rogers State University) and at Oklahoma City when the school was a member of the NCAA Division I.  Along with Evansville's Brad Leaf, Jackson was the first three-time All-Conference pick in conference history (1980, 1981 and 1982).  

His best year was his junior year of 1980–81, when Jackson averaged 24.8 points per game (ranking him sixth in the country in scoring).  Jackson teamed with future NBA player Carl Henry to lead the Chiefs to a Midwestern City Conference tournament title.  At the close of the season, Jackson was named the conference co-Player of the Year with Loyola's Darius Clemons.

After his college career, Jackson was drafted by the Chicago Bulls in the 1982 NBA draft (fifth round, 99th pick overall).  However, Jackson injured his ankle prior to the start of training camp and did not make the team.

References

Date of birth missing (living people)
Living people
American men's basketball players
Basketball players from Memphis, Tennessee
Chicago Bulls draft picks
Junior college men's basketball players in the United States
Oklahoma City Stars men's basketball players
Rogers State Hillcats men's basketball players
Shooting guards
Year of birth missing (living people)